Terese Marie Mailhot (born 15 June 1983) is a First Nation Canadian writer, journalist, memoirist, and teacher.

Early life and education 
Mailhot grew up in Seabird Island, British Columbia, on the Seabird Island First Nation reservation. Her mother, Wahzinak, was a healer, social worker, poet, and radical activist, and her father, Ken Mailhot, was an artist. Her father had been incarcerated and was an alcoholic who molested Mailhot when she was young, and was often violent. Mailhot's mother had a letter-writing relationship with Salvador Agron, and shared the correspondence with musician Paul Simon, who used them for his Broadway musical, The Capeman. The role of Wahzinak was portrayed by Sara Ramirez in the musical. She is one of four children. As a child Mailhot had tuberculosis. She was in foster care periodically and eventually aged out of the system.

Mailhot's background is Nlaka'pamux, part of the indigenous First Nations people of the Interior Salish language group in southern British Columbia. Her maternal grandmother, who she was close to, was raised in the brutal Canadian Indian residential school system.

Mailhot got her GED and attended community college. Mailhot graduated with a bachelor's degree in English from New Mexico State University. In 2016, Mailhot received an MFA in fiction from the Institute of American Indian Arts.

Career 
Mailhot was a columnist at Indian Country Today and was Saturday Editor at The Rumpus. She taught English and composition at Dona Ana Community College in Las Cruces, New Mexico.

In 2017, Mailhot became a post-doctoral fellow at the English Department at Purdue University, where she works with the Native American Educational and Cultural Center. Roxane Gay is a colleague there. Mailhot is also a professor at the Institute of American Indian Arts.

In 2018, Mailhot released her debut book, Heart Berries: A Memoir. Heart Berries deals with sexual abuse, trauma, violence, substance abuse, going hungry, being poor, and neglect. Mailhot has said she sees her journey as being one that reflects intergenerational trauma and genocide. She uses the term "Indian sick" to describe the idea of cleansing the heart and mind in a spiritual process, which is how her community often processes these experiences. The title Heart Berries comes from a story about the healer O'dimin, the Heart Berry Boy, that an Ojibwe friend who is a language teacher told her. The book received overwhelmingly positive reviews in both popular and specialist sources. In March 2018, actress Emma Watson chose Mailhot's book as one of the monthly selections for her book club on Goodreads. Heart Berries is a New York Times bestseller.

Mailhot began writing her memoir while she was institutionalized in a mental institution. Mailhot had committed herself after having a mental breakdown related to dealing with childhood sexual abuse by her father. The book consists of many essays that Mailhot wrote during her years as an MFA student. Some of the book is written from Mailhot to her then-partner, Casey Gray, using an epistolary approach to reflecting on memories of the past.

Personal life 
Mailhot has discussed that she suffers from both post-traumatic stress disorder and bipolar II disorder.

Mailhot was married as a teenager and later married the writer Casey Gray. She has three sons.

Fellowships 
 2015: Southwestern Association for Indian Arts (SWAIA), Discovery Fellowship
 2016: Vermont Studio Center, VSC/Institute of American Indian Arts (IAIA) Creative Writing Fellowship
 Writing by Writers, Fellowship 
 Elk Writer's Workshop, Fellowship
 2017: Purdue University, Tecumseh Postdoctoral Fellow

Selected works and publications

Selected publications

Books 
 
  – Excerpt

See also
 Sherman Alexie, Spokane-Coeur d'Alene-American novelist, short story writer, poet, and filmmaker who supported Mailhot's early work.
 List of writers from peoples indigenous to the Americas
 There There (novel), 2018 novel by fellow IAIA alumnus Tommy Orange about urban Indians in Oakland, California

References

External links 

 

Living people
First Nations women writers
First Nations journalists
Canadian women journalists
21st-century Canadian women writers
New Mexico State University alumni
Institute of American Indian Arts alumni
Purdue University alumni
21st-century First Nations writers
21st-century Canadian non-fiction writers
1983 births
Canadian women memoirists
Journalists from British Columbia
Canadian women academics
Canadian memoirists
21st-century Canadian journalists
Nlaka'pamux people
21st-century memoirists